The women's shot put event at the 2016 IAAF World U20 Championships was held at Zdzisław Krzyszkowiak Stadium on 20 July.

Medalists

Records

Results

Qualification
Qualification: 15.50 (Q) or at least 12 best performers (q) qualified for the final.

Final

References

Shot put
Shot put at the World Athletics U20 Championships